Gerasim "Rezo" Georgievich Khugayev (Xwêgatê Géorgiyê fêrt Gérasim (Rézo); , Gerasime Khugaevi; ; born on 15 November 1946 in Chasaval, Dzau district, South Ossetian Autonomous Oblast, Georgian SSR, Soviet Union) is an Ossetian politician and former Prime Minister of the Republic of South Ossetia. He is the only South Ossetian Prime Minister to serve more than one time, at this date. He first served from October 1993 until May 1994 under Head of State Lyudvig Chibirov, and then again from December 2001 until August 2003, as the first Prime Minister appointed by President of South Ossetia Eduard Kokoity.

From 1975 until 1981, Khugayev studied at the psychology department of the Lomonosov Moscow State University. In 1981, he was elected party secretary in Kvaisa. After a promotion in 1987, he became a member of the very first session of South Ossetia's parliament. He was also actively involved in the 1991–1992 South Ossetia War, where he commanded a unit. After the war, he first became deputy Prime Minister under PM Oleg Teziev and Head of State Torez Kulumbegov, and then Prime Minister.

In 1996, Khugayev was deputy PM in the cabinet of Aleksandr Shavlokhov. He was also a candidate in the 1996 presidential election, the first ever held in the country. Khugayev finished 2nd, after incumbent Head of State Lyudvig Chibirov, with 23.9% of the vote.

In 2001, Khugayev led the Eduard Kokoity's campaign for the 2001 presidential elections. After Kokoity won, he appointed Khugayev as his first prime minister.

References

1946 births
Living people
Prime Ministers of South Ossetia
People from Dzau District